Lawrence Keith Bulen (December 31, 1925 – January 4, 1999) was an Indiana politician.

Early life
Bulen began his primary education in the depths of the Great Depression and graduated from Pendleton High School in 1944 at the height of World War II. He joined the U.S. Army Air Corps and launched a lengthy service to his nation. Keith studied government and earned his Bachelors Degree in 1949 and Juris Doctor in 1952, both from Indiana University.

Political career
Bulen – widely known as "L. Keith Bulen" – had a rocky start in Indianapolis politics. As a deputy prosecutor under Marion County Prosecutor "Honest John" Tinder (1955-1963), he was fired after being accused of fixing a case implicating Indianapolis racketeer Tuffy Mitchell.

Bulen was later elected to the Indiana State House of Representatives in 1960 and was re-elected in 1962 from the westside of Indianapolis. The 1964 Presidential Campaign, with its heavy Republican losses, became a rallying point for dissenting Republicans in central Indiana. Bulen and three others helped to overthrow the Republican establishment in Marion County. He proposed a new way of doing things – including the realization that politics was a profession - such that he became the first paid Chairman of Marion County Republican Central Committee in 1966, where he remained until 1970. In this role he helped give birth to consolidated metropolitan government, known as "Unigov", in Indianapolis. He helped cultivate Mayor Richard Lugar's career and served as his mayoral campaign chairman in 1967 and 1971, and later campaign chairman for his 1974 Senatorial campaign. His effectiveness and success as a campaign organizer garnered widespread acclaim. He served as the Indiana Coordinator for Richard Nixon's presidential campaigns in 1968 and as Nixon prepared to become President, Bulen was considered the leading prospect to head a reorganized Republican National Committee: "Bulen is highly regarded in the National Committee, a strong and thorough organizer; he has proven himself tough enough to move a lot of people around and break some china, yet maintains a strong respect, even among those whom he has offended. He has been through a similar exercise to that we are facing in his own state of Indiana, and is therefore aware of some of the problems that might not be apparent to others. Most important, he could be counted upon to be totally loyal," wrote  John Sears.

From 1972 to 1974 Bulen was chairman of the board of Campaign Communicators, Inc. (CCI), a consulting firm involved in Presidential, State, and local campaigns. CCI hired a future Indiana Governor, Mitchell Daniels, Jr. - a vice president at CCI - who moved back and forth, like Bulen, between the consulting firm and the unsuccessful Lugar for Senate campaign in 1974.  After a fundraising trip to Indianapolis that October by President Gerald R. Ford, Bulen resigned from all of his political positions and in late-December 1974 shut down CCI weeks after Daniels was hired by Lugar's mayoral office. These changes came amidst news reports that a Federal corruption investigation was focused on Bulen's law firm. The story was front page news the next month, as well: "[T]he FBI is conducting an investigation for possible violations of fraud and of the Hobbes Act, and Federal corrupt-practices statues" related to the distribution of liquor licenses in the expanded City-controlled geography created by Unigov.

Bulen held significant campaign responsibilities throughout the national political career of Ronald Reagan. Reagan's rise to national prominence came with the help of the former Nixon Aide who had suggested Bulen run the national party for Nixon in 1968, John Sears. Though the pair knew each other by the time of the 1968 Nixon campaign, they may have met when Sears was at the University of Notre Dame, graduating in either 1960 or 1961. Bulen joined the Reagan effort as a close ally of Sears, coordinating the successful Reagan Indiana presidential campaign primaries in 1976 and 1980. He served as deputy chairman of the national "Reagan for President" Committee from 1979–80 and coordinated the 1980 presidential campaign in 17 eastern states. Bulen developed such a tough campaign reputation that Reagan's staff posted a sign at his victory party that read "Will Rogers never met Keith Bulen".

Following the Reagan administration Bulen remained active in both Indiana and national politics. He served as a senior advisor to President Bush's 1988 campaign. In 1990 he returned to the Indiana House of Representatives and was re-elected again in 1992.

International leadership
In 1970 President Nixon appointed Bulen as U.S. Delegate to the Economic and Social Council of the 49th Session of the United Nations, and re-appointed again in 1973 during the 55th Session. He was also the United States' observer to the United Nations Natural Resources Conference in Nairobi, Kenya, Africa, in 1972 and attended the U.N. Security Council Meeting in Ethiopia that same year.

In 1981 President Ronald Reagan appointed Bulen as Commissioner of the International Joint Commission, a treaty organization tasked with resolving and preventing problems between the United States and Canada. He was praised for resolving a major boundary water dispute between the State of Washington and the Province of British Columbia.

Horse racing and breeding
Bulen also achieved success as a horse owner and breeder. He led the Indiana Standard Bred Association and was inducted into their Hall of Fame.  Abercrombie, the world champion pacer Bulen owned along with the wife of a family known for racketeering,  was voted Harness Horse of the Year in 1978. Abercrombie ended his racing career having won 36 of his 72 lifetime starts with $984,391 in career earnings. He was syndicated in 1979 by Castleton Farm for $3 million and stood his first season at stud (1980) for a fee of $7,500.

Abercrombie was the world's leading money winning sire from 1986 to 1990. As of May 2004, Abercrombie has sired the winners of over $149 million dollars, ranking him as one of the top sires of all time.  He has sired 432 pacers who have earned $100,000 or more, and many of his sons and daughter have gone on to prove nearly as prolific as their famous father in the breeding shed. From 1,574 starters sired by Abercrombie, 1,120 have paced faster than 2:00 while 403 have scored marks below 1:55.

Legacy
Keith Bulen is credited with cultivating the successes of  Senator Richard G. Lugar and Governor Mitch Daniels and Bill Ruckelshaus, Bill Hudnut, John Mutz, and former Governor Bob Orr all credit their political careers to Bulen. 

Each year the IUPUI Department of Political science hosts the "Bulen Symposium on American Politics" . Throwing Chairs and Raising Hell: Politics in the Keith Bulen Era is a book documenting the history of Keith Bulen's legendary leadership.

Honors and awards
Throughout his lifetime Bulen was awarded the Sagamore of the Wabash by four different Indiana governors. He was also made a Kentucky Colonel, Commissioned Admiral in the Texas Navy, and awarded the Order of the Paul Revere Patriots by the Governor of Massachusetts.

References

Republican Party members of the Indiana House of Representatives
1925 births
1999 deaths
United States Army Air Forces soldiers
United States Army Air Forces personnel of World War II
Place of death missing
20th-century American politicians